Thomas A. DiCillo (born August 14, 1953) is an American film director, screenwriter and cinematographer.

Early life
He was born in Camp Le Jeune, North Carolina. His father was Italian and his mother was from New England. He studied creative writing at Old Dominion University in Norfolk, Virginia and went on to study filmmaking at New York University's Film School alongside Jim Jarmusch, Howard Brookner, Sara Driver and Spike Lee. Subsequently, he worked as an actor, then cinematographer, before making his own films.

Career
For his first film, Johnny Suede (1991), DiCillo cast the then-unknown Brad Pitt and Catherine Keener in what would be their first starring roles. It received a nomination for a Grand Jury Prize at the Sundance Film Festival.

For his second film, Living in Oblivion, DiCillo received acclaim for his satire of independent film-making. This 1995 black comedy, itself a low-budget independent film, features Steve Buscemi as a director driven to near-madness by his cast and crew, including a vain Hollywood actor.  Describing the inspiration for and origin of Living in Oblivion in an interview with Salon, DiCillo described making a movie as "one of the most tedious, boring, painful experiences, and that's just when something goes right".

In 2001, his film Double Whammy was released straight to video. Delirious (2006), a comedy starring Steve Buscemi, Michael Pitt, Alison Lohman and Elvis Costello, was screened at the San Sebastian Film Festival where it won three awards (Best Director, Best Original Screenplay, and the Signis Award for originality). The film also screened at the Sundance Film Festival in 2007 and won Best Director at the HBO Comedy Film Festival in Aspen, Colorado.

DiCillo wrote and directed When You're Strange (2009), a documentary about the rock band The Doors, which premiered at the Sundance Film Festival and was nominated for a Grand Jury Prize. It was subsequently nominated for both an Emmy Award, after airing on PBS' American Masters series, and a Grammy Award for Best Long Form Video.

He has published books of two of his screenplays, Living in Oblivion and Box of Moonlight. Both books contain the full scripts along with commentary, stories and anecdotes.

DiCillo also directed "Weeping Willow", a sixth season episode of the television series Law & Order: Criminal Intent, inspired by the lonelygirl15 videos on YouTube. In the episode, a vlogger named Weeping Willow (Michelle Trachtenberg) is kidnapped during a live Internet video, and the kidnappers demand ransom through additional videos.

Filmography

As director
 Johnny Suede (1991)
 Living in Oblivion (1995)
 Box of Moonlight (1996)
 The Real Blonde (1997)
 Double Whammy (2001)
 Delirious (2006)
 When You're Strange (Documentary) (2009)
 Down in Shadowland (Documentary) (2014)

As cinematographer
 Permanent Vacation (1980)
 Underground USA (1980)
 Burroughs: the Movie (1983)
 Variety (1983)
 Stranger Than Paradise (1984)
 Robert Wilson and the Civil Wars (1987)
 Robinson's Garden (1987)
 The Beat (1987)
 Laura Ley (1989)
 End of the Night (1990)
 Coffee and Cigarettes (2003)

References

External links
Official site

Audio interview with DiCillo regarding his entire career. Jekyll and Hyde, 2009

1953 births
Living people
Tisch School of the Arts alumni
People from Jacksonville, North Carolina
American people of Italian descent
Film directors from North Carolina